Cyril Mwenya Chibwe (born 17 June 1993) is a Zambian footballer who plays as a goalkeeper for ZESCO United and the Zambian National Team.

Career

International
Chibwe made his senior international debut on 13 October 2019, coming on as an 86th-minute substitute for Sebastian Mwange in a 2-2 friendly draw with Benin.

References

External links

1993 births
Living people
Zambian footballers
Zambia international footballers
Platinum Stars F.C. players
Garankuwa United F.C. players
Jomo Cosmos F.C. players
Polokwane City F.C. players
ZESCO United F.C. players
South African Premier Division players
National First Division players
Association football goalkeepers
Zambian expatriate footballers
Expatriate soccer players in South Africa
Zambian expatriate sportspeople in South Africa